William FitzRoy may refer to:

 William FitzRoy, 3rd Duke of Cleveland (1698–1774), English nobleman
 William FitzRoy (British Army Officer) (1830–1902), British Army officer
 Lord William FitzRoy (1782–1857), British Royal Navy officer
 William FitzRoy, 6th Duke of Grafton (1819–1882), British peer and politician